219 (two hundred [and] nineteen) is the natural number following 218 and preceding 220.

In mathematics
219 is a happy number.
Mertens function(219) = 4, a record high.
There are 219 partially ordered sets on four labeled elements.
219 is the smallest number that can be represented as a sum of four positive cubes in two different ways.
There are 219 different space groups, discrete and full-dimensional sets of symmetries of three-dimensional space or of crystal structures.

References

Integers